Alain Corminbœuf (born 8 July 1966) is a retired Swiss football defender.

References

1966 births
Living people
Swiss men's footballers
FC Bulle players
Association football defenders
Swiss Super League players